Baby is a 2007 independent film directed by Juwan Chung and starring David Huynh, Tzi Ma, Feodor Chin, Ron Yuan and Kenneth Choi. Considered part of the hood film genre, the film tells the story of an Asian-American youth's gang life in East Los Angeles, set during the mid 1980s to the early 1990s. It has been called "the Asian American Boyz n the Hood" by the San Francisco Chronicle.

The film won Best Narrative Feature at the 2007 Los Angeles Asian Pacific Film Festival and a Special Jury Award for "Outstanding Newcomer" for star David Huynh at the same film festival that year, and a Best Director award for Director Juwan Chung at the 2008 DisOrient Film Festival. It was also distributed by Lionsgate.

Synopsis
Baby is the tragic story of an Asian-American youth trapped in the seedy, dead-end world of hostess bars, pool halls and drug dens that characterize East Los Angeles gang life in the 1980s. Baby (Ryan Andres) is a motherless, poverty stricken 11-year-old with only an alcoholic father (Tzi Ma) to raise him.

Things only get worse when he's taken under the wing of his gangster neighbor Tommy (Ron Yuan), who leads him down a path that lands him in Juvenile Hall for manslaughter, with Benny (Feodor Chin) ostracizing Baby from the group. After seven violent years in prison, Baby (now portrayed by David Huynh) is released, but struggles to fit into a society that rejects him, and soon returns to a life of drugs, street gangs and murder.

Meanwhile Benny has risen through the ranks to become the local Crime Boss for a side of the Wah Ching Triad.  Only his childhood friends and a lost love offer him any hope of turning his life around before it's too late.

Cast

Awards

See also 
 List of hood films

References

External links

2007 films
Action films about Asian Americans
Films about Chinese Americans
Hood films
Triad films
2000s English-language films
2000s American films
2000s Hong Kong films